Eristalinus is a genus of hoverfly. Most species have very distinctive eye marking in the form of spots or banding, though these features may fade on some preserved specimens. Most are stout flies, and are nimble flyers, even compared to other hoverfly species.

Systematics
At one time the members of this genus were divided into three clades (Eristalinus, Eristalodes and Lathyrophthalmus) based on morphological characters such as whether the eyes were spotted or striped. Recently Pérez-Bañon et al. studying the European species of Eristalinus using a combination of molecular data and male genitalia characters have determined that the genus in Europe at least, divides neatly into two clades - Eristalinus (+ Lathyrophthalmus) & Eristalodes. It was also discovered that the eye patterning was not taxonomically important as Eristalodes contained members with eyes either spotted or striped.

The following list is an attempt to organise some of the species under subgeneric headings:

List of species by subgenus

Eristalinus

Eristalinus riki Violovitsch, 1957
Eristalinus sepulchralis (Linnaeus, 1758)

Lathyrophthalmus

(around 80 species; found worldwide)
Eristalinus aeneus (Scopoli, 1763)
Eristalinus aequalis (Adams, 1905)
Eristalinus arvorum (Fabricius, 1787)
Eristalinus astrops Hull, 1941
Eristalinus basalis (Shiraki, 1968)
Eristalinus cerealis Fabricius, 1805
Eristalinus dissimilis (Adams, 1905)
Eristalinus dubiosus (Curran, 1939)
Eristalinus dulcis Karsch, 1887
Eristalinus euzonus Loew, 1858
Eristalinus flaveolus Bigot, 1880
Eristalinus gymnops Bezzi, 1915
Eristalinus haileyburyi (Nayar, 1968)
Eristalinus hervebazini Kløcker, 1926
Eristalinus invirgulatus (Keiser, 1958)
Eristalinus ishigakiensis (Shiraki, 1968)
Eristalinus japonica van der Goot, 1964
Eristalinus kyokoae Kimura, 1986
Eristalinus longicornis (Adams, 1905)
Eristalinus melanops Karsch, 1887
Eristalinus modestus (Wiedemann, 1818)
Eristalinus myiatropinus (Speiser, 1910)
Eristalinus obliquus Wiedemann, 1824
Eristalinus quinquelineatus (Fabricius, 1781)
Eristalinus quinquestriatus (Fabricius, 1794)
Eristalinus tabanoides (Jaennicke, 1867)
Eristalinus tarsalis (Macquart, 1855)
Eristalinus trizonatus (Bigot, 1858)
Eristalinus velox (Violovitsh, 1966)
Eristalinus vicarians Bezzi, 1915
Eristalinus xanthopus Bezzi, 1915

Eristalodes
 
(13 species; Palearctic, Afrotropical, Oriental)
Eristalinus barclayi Bezzi, 1915
Eristalinus fuscicornis (Karsch, 1887)
Eristalinus megacephalus (Rossi, 1794)
Eristalinus paria (Bigot, 1880)
Eristalinus plurivittatus Macquart, 1855
Eristalinus seychellarum Bezzi, 1915
Eristalinus taeniops (Wiedemann, 1818)

Helophilina
(1 species; Afrotropical)
Eristalinus taeniaticeps Becker, 1922

Merodonoides Curran, 1931
(8 species; Afrotropical, Oriental)
Eristalinus abdominalis (Hervé-Bazin, 1914)
Eristalinus caudatus (Doesburg, 1955)
Eristalinus descendens (Becker, 1909)
Eristalinus fasciatus (Macquart, 1834)
Eristalinus gymnops (Bezzi, 1915)
Eristalinus megametapodus Thompson, 2019
Eristalinus modestus (Wiedemann, 1818)
Eristalinus myiatropinus (Speiser, 1910)

Gallery

References

External links

For photos of North American species see BugGuide page: http://bugguide.net/node/view/33249/bgimage?from=0

Hoverfly genera
Diptera of Africa
Diptera of Asia
Diptera of Europe
Eristalinae
Taxa named by Camillo Rondani